Hsu Chin-hsiung (born 10 September 1952) is a Taiwanese wrestler. He competed in the men's freestyle 57 kg at the 1972 Summer Olympics.

References

External links
 

1952 births
Living people
Taiwanese male sport wrestlers
Olympic wrestlers of Taiwan
Wrestlers at the 1972 Summer Olympics
Place of birth missing (living people)
20th-century Taiwanese people